The Daughters of Joshua Cabe is a 1972 American made-for-television Western film directed by Philip Leacock. The story is about an aging homesteader in the Old West who needs children to help him establish his claim on his property. With his real daughters unavailable, he recruits three young women with minor criminal backgrounds to pose as his daughters.

The film was originally written for Walter Brennan. Buddy Ebsen wound up playing the role of Joshua Cabe instead.

The show drew "solid ratings". It was the fifth most watched show that week.

There were two sequels in the next few years, with mostly different casts from the original and from each other.

Plot
Due to a homesteading law, a fur trapper schemes to keep his land by hiring a hooker, a pickpocket and a thief to pose as his family.

Cast
 Buddy Ebsen as Joshua Cabe
 Karen Valentine as Charity 
 Lesley Anne Warren as Mae (as Lesley Warren)
 Sandra Dee as Ada
 Don Stroud as Blue Wetherall
 Henry Jones as Codge Collier 
 Jack Elam as Bitterroot
 Leif Erickson as Amos Wetherall
 Michael Anderson Jr. as Cole Wetherall
 Paul Koslo as Deke Wetherall
 Julie Mannix as Sister Mary Robert
 Ron Soble as Arnie 
 William Katt as Billy Jack (as Bill Katt)
 Claudia Bryar as Warden Tippet
 Eve McVeagh as Mother Superior
 Erin O'Brien-Moore as Matron
 Jon Locke as Plainclothesman
 Sharon Douglas as Saleslady
 Doodles Weaver as Telegraphman
 Barbara Ranies as Carrie

See also
 List of American films of 1972

References

External links

The Daughters of Joshua Cabe at BFI

1972 television films
1972 films
ABC network original films
1972 Western (genre) films
Films directed by Philip Leacock
Television films as pilots
Television pilots not picked up as a series
1970s English-language films
American Western (genre) television films